Alice Alison Lide (1890–1955) was the recipient of a Newbery Honor in 1930, for her book Ood-Le-Uk the Wanderer. Alice was raised in Richmond, Alabama by her parents, Joseph D. and Annie Hearst Alison.  Lide attended Converse College, in South Carolina and later moved on to Columbia University, in New York City.

Bibliography

Ood-le-uk the Wanderer. Boston; Little, 1930.
Aztec Drums. New York; Longman Green, 1938.
Johnny of the 4-H Club. Boston; Little, 1941.
Lapland Drum. Nashville; Abingdon, 1955.
Little Indian Ongo. Richmond, Va.; Johnson Pub. Co., 1948.
Magic Word for Elin. Nashville; Abingdon, 1958.
Mystery of the Mahteb, a Tale of Thirteenth-Century Ethiopia. New York; Longman Green, 1942.
Princess of Yucatan. New York; Longman Green, 1939.
Yinka-Tu the Yak. New York; Viking, 1938.

References

External links

 
 
 

1890 births
1955 deaths
American children's writers
Converse University alumni
Columbia University alumni
Newbery Honor winners